Ansonica Costa dell'Argentario is a dry Italian white wine from the region of Tuscany, Italy. Ansonica is made from the Ansonica (Inzolia) grape.  The DOC is located on the extreme southern coast of Tuscany and on the island of Giglio.  The DOC was created in 1995, and allows for a minimum of 85% Ansonica and a 15% maximum of other white grapes in the blend.

References

External links
altacucina For information on Ansonica
italianmade.com Discussing the DOC
Parrina A producer of Ansonica Costa dell'Argentario

Wines of Tuscany